Iridomyrmex mattiroloi is a species of ant in the genus Iridomyrmex. Described by Emery in 1898, the species is only endemic to Tasmania in Australia, commonly seen foraging on low vegetation.

References

Iridomyrmex
Hymenoptera of Australia
Insects described in 1898